Lin Miao (born April 9, 1983 in Dandong, Liaoning) is a Chinese sprint canoer who has competed since the late 2000s. He finished seventh in the K-4 1000 m event at the 2008 Summer Olympics in Beijing.

References

Sports-Reference.com - Lin Miao's profile

1983 births
Living people
People from Fushun
Sportspeople from Liaoning
Sportspeople from Sichuan
Olympic canoeists of China
Canoeists at the 2008 Summer Olympics
Asian Games medalists in canoeing
Canoeists at the 2006 Asian Games
Chinese male canoeists
Medalists at the 2006 Asian Games
Asian Games gold medalists for China